Tapirapé-Aquiri National Forest is a national forest in the state of Pará, Brazil.
It is surrounded by other protected areas, so has suffered relatively little from deforestation.

Location

The Tapirapé-Aquiri National Forest is in the Amazon biome.
It covers parts of the municipalities of Marabá, São Félix do Xingu and Parauapebas in the state of Pará.

After granting the mining concession for the rich iron ore deposits in the Carajás Mountains, the federal government created three protected areas around the concession: the Gelado Environmental Protection Area, the Tapirapé Biological Reserve and the Tapirapé-Aquiri National Forest.
These areas, together with the Carajás National Forest, form a continuous block around the Carajás Mineral Province.
The forest borders the Tapirapé Biological Reserve to the north, the Carajás National Forest to the east, the Xikrin do Cateté Indigenous Territory to the south and the Itacaiúnas National Forest to the west, with which it overlaps.

Environment

The climate is moist tropical with a dry winter from June to October.
Monthly temperatures are always above .
All of the eastern portion is in the Itacaiúnas River basin.
The forest is covered by open submontane rainforest, dense submontane rainforest and alluvial rainforest, generally undisturbed due to its inaccessible location, although it is threatened to some extent by illegal logging, mineral prospecting and predatory hunting and fishing.
The indigenous community of Xicrin do Cateté collects Castanhas do Pará nuts for commercial sale, and engages in subsistence hunting.

Conservation

The Tapirapé-Aquiri National Forest was created by decree 97.720 of 5 May 1989.
It is administered by the Chico Mendes Institute for Biodiversity Conservation (ICMBio).
It is classed as IUCN protected area category VI (protected area with sustainable use of natural resources).
The objective is sustainable multiple use of forest resources and scientific research, with emphasis on sustainable exploitation of native forest.
The advisory council was appointed on 22 April 2005 with the main goal of developing the management plan, which was approved on 5 December 2006.
Protected species include Uta Hick's bearded saki (Chiropotes utahicki), jaguar (Panthera onca) and cougar (Puma concolor).
The proposed South Amazon Ecological Corridor would link the conservation unit to other protected areas and indigenous territories in the region.

Notes

Sources

National forests of Brazil